PTMS may refer to

  Parathymosin, a human gene
 Petition to make special, in United States patent law
 Photothermal microspectroscopy, an instrumental technique